Ivan Kontek (born 29 January 1997) is a Croatian football player. He plays for Italian  club Foggia on loan from Cesena.

Club career
He made his professional Slovenian PrvaLiga debut for Aluminij on 20 July 2018 in a game against Celje.

On 19 September 2020, he signed a two-year contract with Italian third-tier Serie C club Ternana. For the 2021–22 season, Ternana was promoted to Serie B.

On 9 July 2022, Kontek joined Cesena on a two-year deal. On 5 January 2023, Kontek moved on loan to Foggia. Foggia will hold an obligation to purchase his rights if the club will gain promotion to Serie B at the end of the 2022–23 season.

References

External links
 

1997 births
Living people
Footballers from Zagreb
Association football defenders
Croatian footballers
NK Sesvete players
NK Aluminij players
Ternana Calcio players
Cesena F.C. players
Calcio Foggia 1920 players
First Football League (Croatia) players
Slovenian PrvaLiga players
Serie C players
Serie B players
Croatian expatriate footballers
Expatriate footballers in Slovenia
Croatian expatriate sportspeople in Slovenia
Expatriate footballers in Italy
Croatian expatriate sportspeople in Italy